Carl Theodor Anger (Danzig, 31 July 1803 – Danzig, 25 March 1858) was a German mathematician and astronomer. He was a student of and assistant to Friedrich Bessel at the Königsberg Observatory from 1827 until 1831. Thereafter, he was appointed as astronomer by the Naturforschende Gesellschaft in Danzig.

Besides his scientific work, especially that related to Bessel functions, he is also known for his first-hand biographical notes on the life of Bessel.

Publications

See also 
Anger function
Jacobi–Anger expansion

Notes

References

External links
  ADB:Anger, Karl Theodor – Wikisource
  Franz Kössler's Personlexikon von Lehren des 19. Jahrhunderts (Abbehusen – Axt); Anger, Karl Theodor: bibliography with 41 entries

1803 births
1858 deaths
19th-century German mathematicians
19th-century German astronomers
Scientists from Gdańsk
People from West Prussia